Kaudihar is a block of Soraon tehsil in Allahabad/ Prayagraj District. Kaurihar is located on the Lucknow-Prayagraj National Highway, at a distance of 22 km from the District headquarter.
till the year 2019 it was the biggest block of Uttar Pradesh having more than 125 gram sabhas, in the year 2019 Kaudihar was divided into three blocks Kaurihar, Shringverpur Dham and Bhagwatpur. Now there are 36 Gram Sabhas in Kaudihar Block. Kaurihar is very famous market where weekly cattle market is held on every Thursday and Sunday.

References 

Allahabad district